Stanislas Wawrinka was the defending champion, and he won in the final 6–7(2), 6–2, 6–1 against Potito Starace.

Seeds

Draw

Finals

Top half

Bottom half

References
Main Draw
Qualifying Singles

BSI Challenger Lugano - Singles
BSI Challenger Lugano